The Sinchis (from the Quechua word sinchi, 'strong, brave'), also known as the Sinchis de Mazamari after their training location, are a paratrooping unit of the National Police of Peru specialized in counterinsurgency and anti-narcotics operations.

The unit was part of the Civil Guard from its formation in 1965 until 1991, when it was incorporated into the National Police of Peru. The Sinchis played an important role in their fight against Shining Path during the internal conflict in Peru in the 1980s and 1990s. According to the Truth and Reconciliation Commission, the unit is responsible for crimes committed against the Quechua population of the regions of Ayacucho, Apurimac and Huancavelica.

Etymology
In all Quechuan languages, the word sinchi is frequent and has the meaning “hard, resilient, stubborn, strong, brave”. In Ayacuchan Quechua, its main meaning is “abundant” or, as an adverb, “enough”. It applies both to people and to things or conditions, and for this reason it can also mean "huge, great". It can also mean “warrior” or “soldier”, especially in the context of the Incas. The plural of sinchi in Quechua is sinchikuna.

History
The unit was first created during the first government of Fernando Belaúnde Terry as the 48th Command of the Civil Guard on June 21, 1965, in the town of Mazamari. At that time the Revolutionary Left Movement, a guerrilla group led by Luis de la Puente Uceda, was operating in the province of Satipo. The Sinchis were trained by the Green Berets and the CIA, and financed entirely by the United States. In 1966, the Armed Forces of Peru managed to defeat the guerrillas.

After Juan Velasco Alvarado's coup, the Sinchis no longer received US support. However, in 1969 the unit was sent to Huanta in the Department of Ayacucho to put down a student rebellion against the imposition of a charge of at least one hundred soles on those who failed a course. In the so-called Huanta Rebellion, some twenty students and peasants were killed by the Sinchis and other police forces. Nevertheless, the Velasco dictatorship repealed the decree.

On September 5, 1979, peasants from the community of San Juan de Ondores occupied the lands of the Atocsaico estate, which had been taken over by the Cerro de Pasco Copper Corporation in 1926 and in the Agrarian Reform of 1969 was not returned to the community but rather handed over to the Túpac Amaru Agricultural Society of Social Interest, although in 1963 a court had annulled the sale of Atocsaico. The peasants demanded the restitution of the lands to the community. On December 18, 1979, the government of Francisco Morales Bermúdez sent 300 Sinchis who forced the peasants to vacate the state lands. The latter responded with stones. The Sinchis opened fire resulting in two peasants being killed, some 15 wounded and 44 detained.

On October 12, 1981, when the Shining Path attacked the Tambo police post in the La Mar Province in Ayacucho, President Fernando Belaunde Terry declared a state of emergency in Ayacucho and sent 193 police officers, including 40 Sinchis, to Ayacucho. The Sinchis had their headquarters in the city of Huamanga, where there were never more than 120 of them. However, in their helicopters they arrived very quickly at the towns of the region, never more than nine men. Almost all of the Sinchis were coastal residents who did not speak the language of the region’s peasant population, Ayacuchan Quechua, or know anything about their culture. According to testimonies kept by the Truth and Reconciliation Commission, the Sinchis committed numerous human rights abuses.

In September 1982, the Sinchis arrived in two helicopters in Chalcos, presented themselves as protectors against the Shining Path terrorists and organized sports activities. After two weeks, however, they got drunk, arrested the teachers and killed them, accusing them of being terrorists.

In January 1983, the Sinchis entered the community of Uchuraccay and instilled in the peasants to kill everyone who came on foot because the Sinchis always came by helicopter. A few days later, on January 26, 1983, the community members killed eight journalists and two other people, calling them terrorists. In the months afterward, the town was eradicated by the Shining Path.

One of the most well-known atrocities was the Socos (or Soccos) massacre, a community in Huamanga Province, in which 32 men, women and children were murdered on November 13, 1983 by one unit of Sinchis.

On February 8, 1984, criminal proceedings were opened by the First Court of Huamanga for aggravated homicide and attempted homicide, and on July 15, 1986, eleven defendants were sentenced, including six Sinchis, for the murder of the 32 inhabitants of Socos and for attempted murder, while 15 defendants were acquitted. The subjects were sentenced to prison terms between 10 and 25 years, but the first was released on December 1, 1988, the last on June 17, 1991, with parole. Civil Guard Lieutenant Luis Alberto Dávila Reátegui, sentenced to no less than 25 years, was released on parole on April 5, 1991.

In 1989, the Shining Path began to infiltrate the Ene River valley in the Satipo Province in the Department of Junín. The Drug Enforcement Administration (DEA) and the Green Berets took over the Cutivireni mission in the Río Tambo District of the same province, where some 700 Asháninka lived with Franciscan missionaries, as a military base to combat terrorists and drug traffickers. Some Ashaninkas abandoned the mission and joined Shining Path, while others began to fight with the Sinchis against the guerrillas. Many Ashaninka on both sides fell. 169 Asháninka under the direction of Father Mariano Gagnon were transferred to Kirigueti, a Machiguenga town in the Urubamba valley.

See also
Paratrooper Company, another paratrooper unit deployed during the 1941 Ecuadorian–Peruvian War

References

Bibliography

External links
 Asociación de los Sinchis, official website
 Final report of the Truth and Reconciliation Commission: Fuerzas policiales. Lima 2003.
 Final report of the Truth and Reconciliation Commission: 2.7. Las ejecuciones extrajudiciales en Socos (1983). Lima 2003.

Internal conflict in Peru
Law enforcement agencies of Peru